Camylofin is an antimuscarinic drug.

Camylofin is a smooth muscle relaxant with both anticholinergic action as well as direct smooth muscle action. Anticholinergic action is produced by inhibiting the binding of acetylcholine to muscarinic receptors, but the action is less pronounced. Direct smooth muscle relaxation is achieved by inhibiting phosphodiesterase type IV, which leads to increased cyclic AMP and eventually reduced cytosolic calcium. Thus camylofin has a comprehensive action to relieve smooth muscle spasm. It is used to treat stomach ache in infants and children. Usually it is given in combination with paracetamol to treat stomach ache, as well as pyrexia.

References 

Diethylamino compounds
Carboxylate esters
Muscarinic antagonists